The 80th Golden Globe Awards honored the best in film and American television of 2022, as chosen by the Hollywood Foreign Press Association (HFPA). The ceremony was held on January 10, 2023, from The Beverly Hilton in Beverly Hills, California, with it being aired live in the United States on NBC and streamed on Peacock. Jerrod Carmichael hosted the ceremony.

The nominees were announced on December 12, 2022. Father-daughter duo George and Mayan Lopez were scheduled to announce the nominations together, but the former dropped out after testing positive for COVID-19; he was replaced by Selenis Leyva. Eddie Murphy and Ryan Murphy were announced as the recipients of the Cecil B. DeMille Award and Carol Burnett Award, respectively.

The Banshees of Inisherin received a leading eight nominations, including Best Motion Picture – Musical or Comedy and Best Director (Martin McDonagh), the most achieved by any film since Cold Mountain in 2004. It also, along with ABC's first-year mockumentary comedy Abbott Elementary, won the most awards of the night with three wins.

The ceremony also marked Lisa Marie Presley's last public appearance before her death two days later on January 12, 2023.

Ceremony information
On September 20, 2022, the HFPA and Golden Globe Awards producer Dick Clark Productions announced that the ceremony would be broadcast on NBC and streamed on Peacock under a one-year contract. After being the Golden Globes' regular broadcaster since 1996, NBC declined to air the previous year's ceremony in support of boycotts by various media companies, actors, and other creatives over the HFPA's history of financial malfeasance and lack of action to increase the membership diversity of the organization. The HFPA had previously approved a major restructuring in July 2022, under which HFPA interim CEO Todd Boehly agreed to establish a for-profit entity via his holding company Eldridge Industries (owner of DCP and entertainment trade publication The Hollywood Reporter) that will hold the Golden Globe Awards' intellectual property and oversee the "professionalization and modernization" of the ceremony, including "[increasing] the size and diversity of the available voters for the annual awards". The HFPA's philanthropic activities would continue separately as a non-profit entity.

Due to conflicts with NBC's Sunday Night Football (the NFL regular season has been extended with an additional game since 2021), and to avoid competing with the 2023 College Football Playoff National Championship on Monday January 9 (a game played at Inglewood's SoFi Stadium) and the 28th Critics' Choice Awards the following Sunday (January 15), the Globes ceremony was scheduled for Tuesday, January 10, 2023. It was the first Golden Globes ceremony to take place on a Tuesday since the 19th edition in 1962, as well as the first to be staged on a weeknight since the 64th Golden Globes were presented on Monday, January 15, 2007.

Among the changes include modifications to the supporting acting categories for television: Both categories for Best Supporting Actor and Best Supporting Actress in a Series, Miniseries, or Television Film have been split into separate categories for "Musical-Comedy or Drama" and "Limited Series, Anthology Series, or Motion Picture Made for Television".

Winners and nominees

Film

Films with multiple nominations
The following films received multiple nominations:

Films with multiple wins
The following films received multiple wins:

Television

Series with multiple nominations
The following television series received multiple nominations:

Series with multiple wins
The following series received multiple wins:

Cecil B. DeMille Award
The Cecil B. DeMille Award is an honorary award for outstanding contributions to the world of entertainment. It is named in honor of its first recipient, director Cecil B. DeMille.

 Eddie Murphy

Carol Burnett Award
The Carol Burnett Award is an honorary award for outstanding and lasting contributions to television on or off the screen. It is named in honor of its first recipient, actress Carol Burnett.

 Ryan Murphy

Presenters

See also
 50th Annie Awards
 95th Academy Awards
 28th Critics' Choice Awards
 38th Independent Spirit Awards
 43rd Golden Raspberry Awards
 29th Screen Actors Guild Awards
 76th British Academy Film Awards

References

External links
 
 
 Golden Globes 2023: The Winners and Show Recap at Hollywood Foreign Press Association

2023 in California
Golden Globe
Golden Globe
080
January 2023 events in the United States
Golden Globe